A bronze bust of Ulysses S. Grant was installed in San Francisco's Golden Gate Park, in the U.S. state of California, in 1896 and removed in 2020. The original sculptor of the bust was a renowned German born sculptor by the name of Rupert Schmid who had been noted for his commissioned work including “The Progress of Civilization”, a memorial arch at Stanford University before it was toppled in an earthquake in 1906.

History
Grant was stationed in northern California in 1852–1854. After Grant's death in 1885, a committee was formed to create a monument in his honor. Rupert Schmid, a German-born immigrant to the United States who had met Grant and had sculpted the bust for Grant's Tomb, was commissioned in 1894 to create a bust. The bust was completed and installed in 1896. Under pressure from the local stonecutters' union, which objected to the use of prison labor in the cutting of the granite base of the statue, the statue was taken down days after its initial installation, and reinstalled with a new base later the same year.

On June 19, 2020 the monument was illegally toppled by protesters and defaced with the words "Adios America" in red paint.

References

External links

 

Busts in California
Busts of presidents of the United States
Cultural depictions of Ulysses S. Grant
Golden Gate Park
Monuments and memorials in California
Monuments and memorials removed during the George Floyd protests
Outdoor sculptures in San Francisco
Sculptures of men in California
Vandalized works of art in California